Kyrylo Karabych; born 26 December 1976) is a Ukrainian conductor.

Biography

Early Life
Karabits' father was the conductor and composer Ivan Karabyts.

Karabits was born in Kyiv (then in the Ukrainian SSR of the Soviet Union). In his youth, Karabits studied piano, musicology and composition developing an interest in conducting at age 13.  His early teachers included Tatiana Kozlova.  In Kyiv, he studied at the Lysenko Music School, and later at the National Tchaikovsky Music Academy.  In 1995, he began studies at the Vienna Musikhochschule and earned a diploma in orchestral conducting after five years of study.  He also attended the Internationale Bachakademie Stuttgart, where he was a pupil of Helmuth Rilling and Peter Gülke. He has done scholarly work on the musical archive of the Berliner Singakademie, such as transcribing the 1784 Johannes Passion of Carl Philipp Emanuel Bach, which was thought to be lost.

Career

Karabits made his first public conducting appearance at age 19.  He was assistant conductor of the Budapest Festival Orchestra from 1998 to 2000.  He also served as associate conductor of the Orchestre Philharmonique de Radio France from 2002 to 2005.  From 2005 to 2007, Karabits was principal guest conductor of the Orchestre Philharmonique de Strasbourg.

Karabits made his North American conducting debut with the Houston Symphony Orchestra in March 2009.  Karabits first conducted the I, CULTURE Orchestra of Poland in 2013.  In September 2014, the orchestra announced the appointment of Karabits as its new artistic director.  In November 2014, he made his first guest-conducting appearances with the Staatskapelle Weimar.  He first conducted a production at the Deutsches Nationaltheater and Staatskapelle Weimar in March 2015.  Based on these appearances, in July 2015, the Deutsches Nationaltheater and Staatskapelle Weimar named Karabits their next Generalmusikdirector (GMD) and chief conductor, effective with the 2016–2017 season, with an initial contract of 3 years. In June 2018, the DNT and Staatskapelle Weimar announced the scheduled conclusion of Karabits' tenure as GMD of the company in the summer of 2019, following an inability to reach terms on a contract negotiation for extending his tenure.

In the opera house, his work has included Yevgeny Onegin at Glyndebourne in 2008, his conducting "a highlight of a vintage Glyndebourne evening"., and La Bohème there in 2012. His Ballo in maschera at the Opéra national du Rhin in November 2008 was noted for "excellent, propulsive conducting", and he made his debuts at English National Opera in 2010 in Don Giovanni and the Deutsche Oper Berlin in Boris Godunov in 2017. He conducted the premiere in Paris of Les orages désirés by Gérard Condé in 2003., and his performance of Sardanapalo by Liszt in Weimar, doing "all he can to inject drama, his tempos are natural and properly pliant" was later issued on CD by Audite.

Bournemouth Symphony Orchestra
In October 2006, Karabits made his first conducting appearance with the Bournemouth Symphony Orchestra (BSO), and returned in October 2007, where both concerts received acclaim.  In November 2007, the BSO announced the appointment of Karabits as their 13th Principal Conductor, after a unanimous vote from the orchestra musicians, effective with the 2009–2010 season.  The BSO appointment marks Karabits' first chief conductorship.  Karabits held the title of Principal Conductor-Designate for the 2008–2009 season, with three concert appearances.  He made his first conducting appearance at The Proms with the BSO in August 2009, and formally took up the BSO principal conductorship in October 2009.  He is the first Ukrainian conductor to be named principal conductor of a UK orchestra.  His initial contract was for 4 years.  

In August 2011, Karabits and the BSO agreed on a three-year extension of his contract as principal conductor through the 2015–2016 season.  In April 2015, the BSO announced that Karabits had signed a rolling contract as principal conductor, to extend his tenure to a minimum date of 2018. In January 2023, the Bournemouth SO announced that Karabits is to stand down as its chief conductor at the close of the 2023-2024, and subsequently to take the title of conductor laureate and serve as artistic director of the orchestra's Voices from the East project.  With the BSO, Karabits has recorded music of Rodion Shchedrin for the Naxos label, and music of Aram Khachaturian for the Onyx Classics label.

Personal Life
Karabits and his wife have two children.

References

External links
 AskonasHolt agency page biography of Kirill Karabits
 Orchestre Philharmonique de Radio France, French-language biography of Kirill Karabits
 Classical CD Review, review of Naxos 8.572405, recording of Rodion Shchedrin's Concerti for Orchestra Nos. 4 and 5, and Khrustal'niye gusli

Ukrainian conductors (music)
Male conductors (music)
Musicians from Kyiv
1976 births
Living people
21st-century conductors (music)
21st-century male musicians